General elections were held in Dominica on 15 August 1957. No political parties contested the elections and all candidates ran as independents. Voter turnout was 75.6%.

Results

References

Dominica
Elections in Dominica
General election
Non-partisan elections
British Windward Islands
Dominica
August 1957 events in North America